Bergamasque may refer to:
Bergamask or Bergomask, a type of dance
 Bergomask, the second of Two Pieces for Piano (1925) by John Ireland (18791962)
Bergamasque, a variant of Eastern Lombard, spoken mainly in the province of Bergamo in Lombardy, Italy
Masques et bergamasques, an orchestral suite by Gabriel Fauré
Suite bergamasque, a piano suite by Claude Debussy